The Serbs in Austria are the second largest ethnic minority group in Austria, after Germans. The first wave of Serbs to Austria began in the early 19th century, while the largest wave was during the migrant worker program of the 1960s and 1970s. Serb immigration to Austria is still active today due to economic and familial factors. Like in most Western European countries, the Serb community in Austria consists mainly of Serbs from Serbia and Bosnia and Herzegovina.

History

Serbs have very long historical presence on the territory of modern Austria. By the end of the Middle Ages, migration of ethnic Serbs towards Austrian lands was caused by expansion of the Ottoman Empire. Exiled members of Serbian noble families were welcomed by Habsburg rulers, who granted them new possessions. In 1479, emperor Friedrich III granted castle Weitensfeld in Carinthia to exiled members of Branković dynasty of Serbia.

During the period of Ottoman–Habsburg wars (from 16th to 18th century), Austrian policy towards Serbs was marked by special interests, related to complex political situation in various regions of the expanding Habsburg monarchy. Emperor Leopold I issued several charters (1690, 1691, 1695) to Eastern Orthodox Serbs, who sided with Habsburgs during the Vienna War (1683-1699), granting them religious freedom in the Monarchy. Serbian Orthodox patriarch Arsenije III visited Austrian capital (Vienna) on several occasions, and died there in 1706.    

Serbian Orthodox metropolitan Isaija Đaković, who visited Austrian capital on several occasions since 1690, also died in Vienna, in 1708. During the 18th and 19th century, new communities of ethnic Serbs were developing in major Austrian cities, consisted mainly of merchants, officers and students, who were under the spiritual jurisdiction of the Serbian Orthodox Metropolitanate of Karlovci.

The Österreichisch Serbische Gesellschaft (Austrian Serbian Society) was founded in 1936 as "Österreichisch-Jugoslawischen Gesellschaft".

In 2011, the Serbian Orthodox Eparchy of Austria and Switzerland was created, centered in Vienna.

Demographics
According to the 2014 census, there were 132,553 (2.2%) Austrian citizens who declared Serbian as their native language. The real number of ethnic Serbs in Austria is estimated to be much higher – e.g. the membership of "Serbische Gemeinschaft in Österreich" (Savez Srba u Austriji), an ethnic Serb association in Austria, exceeds 250,000 people. Vienna is home to 80,000 Serbian residents, making it the largest Serbian community outside of Serbia. The common estimation is a total of 300,000.

Politics
Serbs in Austria tend to vote for Social Democratic Party of Austria (SPÖ).

In the 2020 Viennese state election, Serbs voted for the (SPÖ) with 46%, Austrian People's Party (ÖVP) with 16%, while 9% voted for Freedom Party of Austria (FPÖ) and 5% voted for Team HC Strache – Alliance for Austria (HC). 

From 2006, The Freedom Party of Austria (FPÖ) under the leadership of Heinz-Christian Strache tried to gain support from Serbs in Austria.

Notable people

Military and political figures 
Baron Gabriel von Rodich, general and Governor of Dalmatia
Paul von Radivojevich, general of the Napoleonic Wars
Paul Davidovich, general of the Napoleonic Wars
Sebastian Kurz, former Austrian politician who twice served as chancellor of Austria
Arsenije Sečujac, Habsburg military general
Raoul Stojsavljevic, World War I flying ace
Konstantin Vojnović, politician and professor

Writers and artists 
Vuk Stefanović Karadžić, reformer of the Serbian language
Jovan Jovanović Zmaj, poet
Pavle Julinac writer
Mina Karadžić, painter and writer
Paja Jovanović, Realist painter
Mileva Roller, painter of the Vienna Secession movement
Laza Kostić, poet
Madita, singer

Athletes 
Marko Arnautović, football player
Marco Djuricin, football player
Aleksandar Dragović, football player
Marko Stanković football player
Zlatko Junuzović, football player
Aleksandar Rakić, MMA fighter
Goran Djuricin, football coach and former player
Damir Canadi, football coach
Neno Ašćerić, basketball coach and former player
Luka Ašćerić, basketball player
Jasminka Cive, kickboxer and mixed martial artist

See also

Serbs
Serbian diaspora
Austria–Serbia relations
Gastarbeiter

References

Literature 

 
 
 
 

Austria

Ethnic groups in Austria
Austria
Serbian Orthodox Church in Austria
Austria
Austria